Dally Randriantefy  (born 23 February 1977 in Antananarivo, Madagascar) is a former professional female tennis player.

Randriantefy has won seven singles and 3 doubles titles on the ITF circuit in her career. On 11 April 2005, she reached her best singles ranking of world number 44. On 6 May 2002, she peaked at world number 193 in the doubles rankings. Her best results have been two semi-final appearance at the WTA Strasbourg tournament (a Tier III event) and WTA Acapulco (Tier III).

She retired from professional tennis after a first round loss at the 2006 Australian Open against Akgul Amanmuradova.

Randriantefy took part in 3 Olympic Games in Barcelona (1992), Atlanta (1996) and Athens (2004). She was the Flag bearer of Malagasy (Nationality &, adjective) Olympic Team in Atlanta.

Randriantefy is the best ranked Austronesian, of the Indian Ocean Area player of the Open era.

ITF Circuit finals: 20 (10–10)

Singles: 15 (7–8)

Doubles: 5 (3–2)

External links

1977 births
Living people
Malagasy female tennis players
Olympic tennis players of Madagascar
People from Antananarivo
Tennis players at the 1992 Summer Olympics
Tennis players at the 1996 Summer Olympics
Tennis players at the 2004 Summer Olympics
African Games medalists in tennis
African Games gold medalists for Madagascar
African Games bronze medalists for Madagascar
Competitors at the 1991 All-Africa Games
Competitors at the 1995 All-Africa Games